Minnesota State Highway 10 may refer to:
U.S. Route 10 in Minnesota
Minnesota State Highway 10 (1920-1933)